Reservoir is a four-song CD EP by Irish singer/songwriter Fionn Regan. It was released 20 January 2003 on Anvil Records.

Track listing 
 "Reservoir" – 4:44
 "Red Lane" – 3:50
 "Noah (Ghost in a Sheet)" – 3:12
 "After the Fall" – 3:40

References

2003 EPs
Fionn Regan albums